The 2022–23 Saint Francis Red Flash men's basketball team represented Saint Francis University in the 2022–23 NCAA Division I men's basketball season. The Red Flash, led by 11th-year head coach Rob Krimmel, played their home games at the DeGol Arena in Loretto, Pennsylvania as members of the Northeast Conference.

Previous season
The Red Flash finished the 2021–22 season 9–21, 5–13 in NEC play to finish in a tie for eighth place. In the NEC tournament, they were defeated by Wagner in the quarterfinals.

Roster

Schedule and results

|-
!colspan=12 style=| Non-conference regular season

|-
!colspan=12 style=| NEC regular season

|-
!colspan=9 style=| NEC Tournament

Sources

References

Saint Francis Red Flash men's basketball seasons
Saint Francis (PA)
Saint Francis
Saint Francis